Mat Hoffman (born January 9, 1972) is an American BMX rider who is considered one of the best vert ramp riders in the history of the sport. He is nicknamed "The Condor" and runs the BMX Freestyle brand Hoffman BMX Bikes based out of Oklahoma City, Oklahoma. He was contracted to ride for Haro Bikes.

Career

In 1983, when Hoffman was 11 years old, he competed in a contest in Madison Square Garden. He had learned to ride BMX on his own and did not have any other riders for reference. He remembers: "when I got to that contest I went 'woah, I guess I am going higher than everyone else'."

In 1987, at the age of 15, Hoffman became the youngest SPROO to join the freestyle BMX circuit and was hired to ride for Haro Bikes. An article in Ride Magazine commented: "What's left to say about a guy who ignored all established limits and redefined vert riding – at age 15[?]". In 1989 he won the first contest he entered as a professional and took home a $2,200 check, after winning the amateur contest of the day, taking the year title in the amateur class.

In 1991, Hoffman attained the pro division and launched both Hoffman Promotions and Hoffman Bikes.

He developed the Bicycle Stunt (BS) series to give riders a place to compete and to showcase their talents. ESPN joined with Hoffman Promotions in 1995 to produce and televise the series each year.

The growth of Hoffman Promotions gave birth to the Hoffman Sports Association (H.S.A.), the organizing body for BMX Freestyle events worldwide, such as ESPN's X Games and all international X Games bicycle-stunt events.

Hoffman has produced, directed and hosted several TV series for ESPN including Kids in the Way, HBtv, and Mat's World. In February 2008, Hoffman produced and co-hosted Mat Hoffman's Evel Knievel Tribute with Johnny Knoxville, which aired on MTV and featured record-breaking stunts by Travis Pastrana, Trigger Gunn, Allan Cooke and Davin Halford.

Achievements
Hoffman is responsible for building the sport for decades, providing support to the biggest names in the industry, including Dave Mirra, Jay Miron, Kevin Robinson, Chad Kagy, Seth Kimbrough, Taj Mihelich, Brad Simms, Anthony Napolitan, Mike Escamilla, Rick Thorne, Kevin Jones, Chase Gouin, Pete Augustin, Day Smith, and Art Thomason, among others.

Hoffman and his team were selected to take part in the closing ceremonies of the 1996 Summer Olympic Games in Atlanta, Georgia in a production called "Sport as Art." In 1999, H.S.A. developed Mat Hoffman's Crazy Freakin' Bikers Series (CFB), which provides amateur and professional Freestyle bikers a venue in which they can compete. Not only does the H.S.A. promote, organize and host the series, but it also produces all the television programming for the CFB Series, which is aired on ESPN2.

The H.S.A. organizes BMX Freestyle portions of annual U.S. and international events, including the X Games and all international X Games qualifiers. The year 2005 marked the 14th consecutive year of competition production for Hoffman Promotions.

In 2001, Hoffman competed at the X Games, earning the bronze medal. He stunned the industry and fans, alike, when he set another record by successfully completing the first-ever No-handed 900 at the 2002 X Games, resulting in the silver medal.

Hoffman was the first person to ride an oversized ("Big") ramp in 1993 with his first High Air attempt off of a 24-foot quarter pipe. On one of his runs, he tore his spleen, and had he not gotten to a hospital within five minutes, he would have died. When Hoffman achieved 26.6 feet above the ramp in March 1999 to 2001, he had a team of four professional photographers, an elaborate scaffolding system to record the attempt at different angles and had an ABC Wide World of Sports camera crew on-site.

Hoffman is also credited with being the first person to perform a double peg grind down a handrail, as documented in the video Head First, released in 1991. The trick has gone on to be a foundation of modern-day street riding.

In 2005, Hoffman was elected the President of the International BMX Freestyle Federation, the international governing body of BMX Freestyle. Also in 2005, the Mat Hoffman Action Sports Park opened in Oklahoma City, Oklahoma. It has since been recognized as one of the 10 best such parks in the nation.

In February 2018, Hoffman was inducted into the Oklahoma Sports Hall of Fame.

Filmography
 Aggroman (BMX home video by Eddie Roman, 1989)
 Matt Hoffman's Head First (BMX home video by Eddie Roman, 1991, considered to be the greatest BMX video ever made)
 Colony of Summer (documentary, 1996)
 Keep Your Eyes Open, produced by Tamra Davis and starring Spike Jonze (2002)
 IMAX film Ultimate X (2002)
 XXX, a Rob Cohen film, starring Vin Diesel (2002)
 Jackass: The Movie (2002)
 Jackass Number Two (2006)
 Jackass 2.5 (2007)
 Jackass Presents: Mat Hoffman's Tribute to Evel Knievel (2008)
 X Games 3D: The Movie (2009)
 Jackass 3D (2010)
 Jackass 3.5 (2011)
 Waiting for Lightning (documentary, 2012)
 Being Evel (documentary, 2015)

Television
 Jackass (2 episodes, 2001)
 2004 Kids' Choice Awards (2004)
 MTV Cribs (1 episode, 2004)
 Extreme Makeover: Home Edition (2005)
 Ned's Declassified School Survival Guide (2005)
 Wildboyz (2 episodes, 2005–2006)
 Jackassworld.com: 24 Hour Takeover (2008)
 Nitro Circus (3 episodes, 2009)
 A Tribute To Ryan Dunn (TV documentary, 2011)
 Epicly Later'd: Spike Jonze (TV documentary, 2022)

An ESPN 30 for 30 documentary entitled The Birth of Big Air, directed and produced by Jeff Tremaine, Johnny Knoxville, Spike Jonze and Hoffman himself, was released in July 2010.

Past projects include three shows produced by Hoffman – Mat Hoffman's Freakin Crazy Stunt Show and Mat Hoffman's Aggro Circus at Universal Studios in Orlando, Florida, and Mat Hoffman's Danger Defying Daredevils at Six Flags Magic Mountain near Los Angeles, California.

The book The Ride of My Life documents Hoffman's story through 2001.

Video games
Hoffman worked with Activision to produce the video games Mat Hoffman's Pro BMX (2001) and Mat Hoffman's Pro BMX 2 (2002), the latter released in conjunction with the Mat Hoffman's Pro BMX 2 Tour TV show, which aired on ESPN2 and is available on DVD and VHS.

Hoffman also appeared as an unlockable playable character in Tony Hawk's Pro Skater 4 (2002) and Tony Hawk's American Wasteland (2005), also produced by Activision.

Music videos
Weezer - Memories (2010)

References

External links 
 
 Online photo biography
 Oklahoma City Parks – Mat Hoffman Action Sports Park
 

1972 births
American male cyclists
BMX riders
Living people
Sportspeople from Edmond, Oklahoma
Cyclists from Oklahoma